National Route 264 is a national highway of Japan connecting Saga, Saga and Kurume, Fukuoka in Japan, with a total length of

See also

References

National highways in Japan
Roads in Fukuoka Prefecture
Roads in Saga Prefecture